Clara Sola is a 2021 drama film directed by Nathalie Álvarez Mesén. It was selected as the Costa Rican entry for the Best International Feature Film at the 94th Academy Awards.

Plot
In a remote Costa Rican village, forty-year-old Clara has a sexual awakening after a lifetime of repression. Clara lives with her tyrannical mother and her deceased sister's daughter Maria, and her work consists mostly of taking care of the horse, Yuca, who only listens to her. Maria, who is close to her aunt, is about to turn 15 and has started dating a young man, Santiago. Clara suffers from a curvature of the spine, but her mother will not allow her to get surgery even though it would be covered by insurance, claiming she must keep her as God gave her. In addition, she treats Clara like a child and does everything she can to prevent her from having any pleasure, including sexual pleasure, by rubbing her fingers with chili peppers so masturbation will be painful, and reminding her that any such feelings are sinful. When she was young, Clara was supposedly visited by the Blessed Virgin Mary, and has acquired a reputation as a mystic and a faith healer; she is occasionally called upon to bless people, in a room her mother equipped with shrines and chairs for visitors. One of Clara's gifts is knowing the secret name of animals and people.

As the story progresses, Clara finds friendship with Santiago and appears to develop feelings for him. After she sees him and her niece having sex, she goes to the forest to pleasure herself, and stays out all night. When she comes back her mother prays for Clara's sexual feelings to be taken away by God, and after prayer burns her hand on a candle. Another crisis builds when the mother tries to sell the horse, to pay for her granddaughter's quinceañera. Clara sends the horse away, and then bathes in the river with Santiago and they embrace. She tells him her secret name: Sola. Later, she takes Maria's birthday dress and runs away, to Santiago, who takes her back--but the dress is ruined.

At the quinceañera, drama ensues when Clara is told a dead mare was found by the river. In a daze, she tries to kiss Santiago, who finally repulses her somewhat forcefully, after which Clara causes a ruckus, and the party is disrupted further by a minor earthquake. The next day, Clara sets fire to the shrine in her house, watches the Madonna burn, and then runs away as the room and then the house catch fire. Her family thinks she is still inside; she keeps running and ends up at the river where she bathed once with Santiago. A series of pops in her back suggest her spine is moving back into place, and in the forest Clara sees Yuca looking at her. After a shot of the deserted river bend, the screen fades to black.

Cast
 Wendy Chinchilla Araya as Clara 
 Ana Julia Porras Espinoza as Maria
 Daniel Castañeda Rincón as Santiago
 Flor María Vargas Chavez

Accolades

See also
 List of submissions to the 94th Academy Awards for Best International Feature Film
 List of Costa Rican submissions for the Academy Award for Best International Feature Film

References

External links
 

2021 films
2021 drama films
Costa Rican drama films
2020s Spanish-language films
Swedish drama films